The Big Boss is a 1921 German silent crime film directed by Max Obal and starring Ernst Reicher as the detective Stuart Webbs.

Cast
In alphabetical order

References

Bibliography

External links

1921 films
Films of the Weimar Republic
Films directed by Max Obal
German silent feature films
1921 crime films
German black-and-white films
German crime films
1920s German films
1920s German-language films